The Triple Portrait of Henrietta Maria is a 1638 painting by Antony van Dyck showing Henrietta Maria, wife of Charles I of England. Charles had previously commissioned van Dyck to produce a triple portrait of himself to send to Italy so that Bernini could produce a bust of him. When the bust arrived, the queen ordered a bust of herself by Bernini and commissioned van Dyck to produce a similar triple portrait. The left-facing profile and full-on view are in the Royal Collection, whilst the right-facing profile is probably the portrait of the queen now in the Memphis Brooks Museum of Art.

Bibliography

Gian Pietro Bellori, Vite de' pittori, scultori e architecti moderni, Torino, Einaudi, 1976.
Didier Bodart, Van Dyck, Prato, Giunti, 1997.
Justus Müller Hofstede, Van Dyck, Milano, Rizzoli/Skira, 2004.

External links

Henrietta Maria
Henrietta Maria
1638 paintings
Henrietta Maria
Henrietta Maria
Paintings in the Royal Collection of the United Kingdom
Henrietta Maria